The fire horse  or bing wu is the 43rd combination of the sexagenary cycle. According to a superstition, girls born in such a year will grow up to kill their husbands. Therefore,  birthrates in Japan tend to see a sharp decline.

Years

Superstition

Origin 
There is a superstition that "a woman born in the year of the fire horse has a strong temperament and shortens her husband's life". It is said that the superstition in the early Edo period that "there are many fires in the year of the fire horse", changed to a superstition about women's marriage because Yaoya Oshichi was believed to have been born during the fire horse.

In the Edo period, all human ages were counted using East Asian age reckoning, and if Yaoya Oshichi was born during the fire horse in 1666, then she would have been 18 years old in 1683 when she was burned at the stake. However in various biographies, such as that of Ihara Saikaku, she is 16 years old. , in his jōruri Yaoya Oshichi, placed Oshichi's birth as during the fire horse, which influenced the jōruri  by  et al. to say the same.  in his work  states that Yaoya Oshichi being 11 years old when she hung a plaque at Tennō-ji in 1676 was the basis for assigning her birth year to 1666.

Ki no Kaion had a strong influence on the theatrical world, and the story in Bunkō's Kinsei Kōto Chobunshū has long been considered a true story, although it has been denied in modern times.

Births in 1906 
This superstition continued even into the Meiji era, and in 1906 the number of births decreased by about 4% from the previous year. In some cases, the births of boys were reported to have been shifted to the year before or after they were actually born.

Around 1924, when women born in 1906 were of marriageable age, there was a series of stories denying the superstition and reports of suicides of women whose marriage proposals were broken off, suggesting that the superstition of fire horse births affected women's marriages. In his novel  published in 1907, Natsume Soseki describes Fujio, an evil woman who deceives the main character, as being "a fire horse".

The novelist Ango Sakaguchi, who was born in this year, was given the name , which means , and left a story in his writings about how he was told by relatives that it was "lucky he was born a man". Sakaguchi predicted that this superstition would not go away, which would turn out to be the case in 1966.

Births in 1966 
This superstition remained strong in the Shōwa era, and the birth rate in 1966 dropped 25% from the previous year. Many couples avoided having children or had abortions, especially in rural and regional areas and the number of births was extremely low compared to other years, with only 1,360,974 births. On the other hand, the number of births in the previous year and the following year increased.

Since there were fewer children born in 1966, it was often discussed at the time whether it was easier to take high school and college entrance examinations in this school year (the population including early-borns in 1967 was about 1.6 million) than in other years, but there was no significant difference in the general college entrance rate. While no such increase was seen, the rate of entry into public universities increased in 1985. Additionally, in 1985 the first child rate was 50.9%, the highest ever in statistical history.

On the other hand, Japanese local governments took the following actions against fire horse superstitions: In November 1965, the Yamagata District Legal Affairs Bureau of the Ministry of Justice sponsored the "Fire Horse Banishment Campaign" in Yamagata City, and on the 21st of the same month, a parade was held in the city to raise awareness of the issue. According to the Legal Affairs Bureau, this was due to a number of consultations regarding the issue of childbearing, which led to divorce settlements and harassment from neighbors. A similar movement was also underway in Kasukawa-mura in Gunma Prefecture (now Kasukawa-cho, Maebashi), led by the village mayor, who declared it a "village of banishment of superstition". The village office conducted a survey of 1,400 women born in 1906 and the years before and after, and worked to publicize the fact that fire horse superstitions have no basis. The city of Kurume in Fukuoka Prefecture strongly rejected fire horse beliefs in its public relations paper, calling it "a fairy tale from once upon a time", "a truly strange custom most unbecoming of a scientific Japan, which last year produced its second Nobel Prize winner", and "of the world of fairy tales".

Births in 2026 
The next year of the fire horse will be 2026. World Bank speculated that the trend will not continue in 2026.

Footnotes

References

Annotations 

Chinese astrology
Superstitions of Japan